An entrepreneur is someone who designs, launches, and runs a new business.

Entrepreneur may also refer to:

 Entrepreneur (horse), a racehorse
 Entrepreneur (magazine), a business magazine
 Entrepreneur (video game), a 1997 business simulation video game
 "Entrepreneur", a song on the album History: Function Music by E-40
 The Entrepreneur, a 2011 film